Podsitarjevec is a former settlement in the Municipality of Litija in central Slovenia. It is now part of the town of Litija. The area is part of the traditional region of Lower Carniola and is now included with the rest of the municipality in the Central Sava Statistical Region.

Geography
Podsitarjevec stands in the southern part of Litija, below the southeastern slope of Sitarjevec Hill.

History
Podsitarjevec is a relatively young settlement; it was initially populated by factory and mine workers associated with the lead mine at Sitarjevec Hill. Podsitarjevec  had a population of 23 living in eight houses in 1931. Podsitarjevec was annexed by Litija in 1955, ending its existence as a separate settlement.

References

External links
Podsitarjevec on Geopedia

Populated places in the Municipality of Litija